Denis Alphonso Charles (December 4, 1933 – March 26, 1998) was a jazz drummer.

Biography
Charles was born in St. Croix, Virgin Islands, and first played bongos at age seven with local ensembles in the Virgin Islands. In 1945, he moved to New York, and gigged frequently around town. In 1954, he began working with Cecil Taylor, and the pair collaborated until 1958. Following this he played with Steve Lacy, Gil Evans, and Jimmy Giuffre. He befriended Ed Blackwell, and the two influenced each other.

He recorded with Sonny Rollins on a calypso-tinged set, and then returned to time with Lacy, with whom he played until 1964. He worked with Archie Shepp and Don Cherry in 1967, but heroin addiction saw him leave the record industry until 1971. In the 1970s and 1980s, he played regularly on the New York jazz scene with Frank Lowe, David Murray, Charles Tyler, Billy Bang, and others, and also played funk, rock, and traditional Caribbean music. He released three discs as a leader between 1989 and 1992, and died of pneumonia in his sleep in New York in 1998.

Charles died four days after a five-week European tour with the Borgmann/Morris/Charles (BMC) Trio, with Wilber Morris and Thomas Borgmann. His last concert with this trio took place at the Berlin's Willy-Brandt-Haus. With the BMC Trio he recorded some albums in his last two years. A fifth CD was released after he died: The Last Concert - Dankeschön, Silkheart Records, 1999.

In 2002, Veronique Doumbe released a film documentary, Denis A. Charles: An Interrupted Conversation, about the life of Charles.

Discography

As leader
 1989: Queen Mary (Silkheart)
 1991: Captain of the Deep (Eremite)
 1992: A Scream for Charles Tyler (Adda)

As sideman
With Cecil Taylor
 1956: Jazz Advance (Transition)
 1958: At Newport (Verve)
 1959: Looking Ahead! (Contemporary)
 1959: Love for Sale (United Artists)
 1959: In Transition (Blue Note)
 1960: The World of Cecil Taylor (Candid)
 1960: Air (Candid)
 1961: Cell Walk for Celeste (Candid)
 1961: Jumpin' Punkins (Candid)
 1961: New York City R&B (Candid) with Buell Neidlinger

With Steve Lacy
 1958: Soprano Sax (Prestige)
 1963: School Days
 1979: Capers (hat Hut)
 1982: The Flame (Soul Note)

With Gil Evans
 1959: Great Jazz Standards (World Pacific)

With Sonny Rollins
 1962: What's New? (RCA Victor)

With Archie Shepp
 1967: The Magic of Ju-Ju (Impulse!)

With Peter Kuhn
 1979: Livin' Right (Big City)
 1981: The Kill (Soul Note)

With Billy Bang
 1981: Rainbow Gladiator (Soul Note)
 1982: Invitation (Soul Note)
 1982: Bangception, Willisau 1982
 1988: Valve No. 10 (Soul Note)

With Jemeel Moondoc
 1981: Konstanze's Delight (Soul Note)
 1981: We Don't (Eremite, issued 2003)
 1986: Nostalgia in Times Square (Soul Note)

With Wilber Morris and Charles Tyler
 1981: Collective Improvisations (Bleu Regard, 1994)

With The Jazz Doctors (Rafael Garrett, Frank Lowe, Billy Bang)
 1983: Intensive Care (Cadillac)

With Rob Brown 
 1990: Breath Rhyme (Silkheart)

With William Parker
 1980: Through Acceptance of the Mystery Peace (Centering) 
 1995: In Order to Survive (Black Saint)

With John Blum (pianist)
 1998: Astrogeny (Eremite, 2005)

With Raphe Malik
 1999: ConSequences (Eremite)

With Sirone
 2005: Live (Atavistic)

References

External links
Audio Recordings of WCUW Jazz Festivals - Jazz History Database

1933 births
1998 deaths
People from Saint Croix, U.S. Virgin Islands
Jazz drummers
Deaths from pneumonia in New York (state)
20th-century drummers